Kaycee School is a small rural K–12 public school in Johnson County School District #1 in Kaycee, Wyoming. Enrollment is approximately 160 students.

External links

Educational institutions in the United States with year of establishment missing
School districts in Wyoming
Education in Johnson County, Wyoming